Aldo Giordani (1914–1992) was an Italian cinematographer.

Selected filmography
 Night Taxi (1950)
 Welcome, Reverend! (1950)
 The Force of Destiny (1950)
 The King's Mail (1951)
 Beauties in Capri (1952)
 Too Bad She's Bad (1954)
 The Moorish Queen (1955)
 The Two Friends (1955)
 A Woman Alone (1956)
 Engaged to Death (1957)
 The Mongols (1961)
 Desert Raiders (1964)
 A Sword for Brando (1970)
 Amuck! (1972)
 Due sul pianerottolo (1976)

References

Bibliography
 Peter Cowie & Derek Elley. World Filmography: 1967. Fairleigh Dickinson University Press, 1977.

External links

1914 births
1992 deaths
Italian cinematographers
Film people from Rome